Kedron Township is a township in Woodbury County, Iowa, USA.

Details

Discord is the name of a former unincorporated community in Kendron township.  A post office was established at Discord in 1870, and remained in operation until 1884.  

The origin of the name Discord is obscure.  Discord has been called the "best representation of complete abandonment [in the area] now marked only by a sign."

References

Townships in Woodbury County, Iowa
Townships in Iowa